Lake Revelstoke or Revelstoke Lake or Revelstoke Lake Reservoir is an artificial lake on the Columbia River, north of the town of Revelstoke, British Columbia and south of Mica Creek.  This lake is the reservoir formed by the Revelstoke Dam, which during its construction was also known as the Revelstoke Canyon Dam, inundating the Columbia's canyon in this area and the historic Dalles des Morts (Death Rapids) and some of the former gold diggings of the Big Bend Gold Rush.  The dam's site is at what had been the head of river navigation by steamboat from Northport, Washington via the Arrow Lakes.

References

Revelstoke Dam Visitor Centre at BCHydro.com

Columbia River
Revelstoke
Revelstoke
Revelstoke, British Columbia
Kootenay Land District